Bönnsch is a Ripuarian dialect of German, which is spoken in Bonn and the bordering municipalities.

Bönnsch is very similar to the more northern Kölsch of Cologne and distinct from the latter only in particular points. One can find a main difference and some other features, which however do not occur among all speakers or are being levelled more and more due to the influence of Standard German and also Kölsch itself (which is more present in culture and broadcasting).

In private life (family, friends, clubs, local pubs etc.), the dialect is still used relatively frequently in the region. However, it has almost vanished as a vernacular in public places. Almost all speakers of Bönnsch use an adapted kind of Standard German when talking to people who do not belong to their private circle of acquaintances (see Rhinelandic regiolect).

Characteristical monophthongization 
The main characteristic of Bönnsch in comparison to Kölsch is the absence of word-internal original diphthongs.

Note that these monophthongs do not occur word-finally. Thus both Bönnsch and Kölsch use zwei ("two") and Dau ("push").

In Standard German, ancient Germanic au und ai have been preserverd. However, Standard German later merged Germanic ū and ī with these diphthongs, which occurred neither in Bönnsch nor Kölsch. Therefore, some Standard German rhyming couplets do not exist in the Ripuarian dialects. For example, standard heiß ~ weiß vs. Bönnsch heeß ~ wieß (English "hot" and "white"); standard kaufen ~ saufen vs. Bönnsch koofe ~ suffe (English "buy" and "drink").

In this case, Bönnsch preserves two diphthongs which emerged through vocalization of r. Thus one says Vierdel  instead of Kölsch  ("quarter") and hä wurd  instead of Kölsch  ("he became").

Other features 
Some Bönnsch speakers do not distinguish the grammatical endings -e and -er and pronounce both of them  (as in English antenna). This peculiarity is declining in actual usage, but is still well known as a typical feature of Bönnsch.

Contrary to Kölsch, both appear like  in Bönnsch, at least to non-Bönnsch listeners. Whether or not there are still two different phonemes in Bönnsch, which are distinguished at least by natives, is an open question.

The auxiliary verb sinn ("to be") traditionally uses the infinitive form for the 1st person singular of the present tense, thus: ich sinn for "I am". Kölsch uses ich ben, which is closer to Standard German (bin) and therefore has become quite common in Bonn as well.

For historical reasons, the Bönnsch vocabulary has a rural imprint and has preserved some Middle High German words, which have long died out in the urban Kölsch. Moreover, the Bönnsch pronunciation is thought to be softer and its intonation is considered to be (even) more rhythmic than that of Kölsch. However, such characteristics are difficult to measure and may vary greatly among speakers.

Finally, there are different forms for individual words, e.g. Bönnsch att instead of Kölsch allt ("already"), donn instead of dunn ("to do"), ühr doot instead of ehr deit ("you [all] do"), du siss instead of do sühs ("thou seest").

Examples 
In German studies, the German dialects are characterized and compared to each other by means of the so-called Wenker sentences. The first three of these forty sentences are rendered in Bönnsch as follows.

  − In winter, the dry leaves are flying around in the air.
  − It will soon stop snowing, then the weather is getting better again.''
  − Put (pieces of) coal in the oven so that the milk will start boiling soon.

Bibliography

External links 
 Complete list of the Wenker sentences in Bönnsch
 Example of spoken Bönnsch
 Small Bönnsch-dictionary (in German language)

Bonn
Ripuarian language
North Rhine-Westphalia